Pseudostracilla is a monotypic moth genus in the subfamily Lymantriinae. Its only species, Pseudostracilla infausta, is found in Sierra Leone. Both the genus and the species were first described by Erich Martin Hering in 1926.

References

Lymantriinae
Monotypic moth genera